Valentín González González (4 November 1904 – 20 October 1983), popularly known as El Campesino (the Peasant), was a Spanish Republican military commander during the Spanish Civil War.

Life

Spanish Civil War 
Born in Malcocinado, Badajoz, González worked as a miner and was a member of the Communist Party, establishing one of the first militia units to counter Francisco Franco's Nationalist Army upon the outbreak of the Civil War. As a brigade commander, González personally took part in all of the major actions that occurred during the Nationalists' assault on Madrid in 1936. He also commanded formations during the battles of the Corunna Road (December 1936), the Jarama, and Guadalajara (March 1937).

In the summer of 1937, he led the 46th Division in the Battle of Brunete. Heavily promoted as a heroic figure by Soviet propaganda, González was accused by other officers in the Ejercito Popular of being brutal in his treatment of his men, unsuited for modern battle, and an egomaniac.

He led his men in the Battle of Belchite, the Battle of Teruel, and Catalonia throughout the war, before being forced to emigrate to the Soviet Union upon the Nationalist victory in 1939.

Soviet Union 
Along with other exiled Spanish Republican commanders, he was enrolled in the Frunze Military Academy but was expelled for incompetence.  He was later imprisoned in Gulag labor camps in Vorkuta where he worked as a brigadier of miners. Following this, he escaped the Vorkuta gulag and fled the Soviet Union across the Iranian border in 1949.

After the Spanish transition to democracy in 1978, he returned to live in Spain. He died in Madrid.

References

Footnotes

Bibliography 
 
 

1904 births
1983 deaths
Communist Party of Spain politicians
Exiles of the Spanish Civil War in France
Exiles of the Spanish Civil War in the Soviet Union
Foreign Gulag detainees
People from Campiña Sur (Badajoz)
Spanish military personnel of the Spanish Civil War (Republican faction)
Spanish people imprisoned abroad